Omari may refer to:

Places
 Omari, Bushehr, a village in Bushehr Province, Iran
 Omari, South Khorasan, a village in South Khorasan Province, Iran

Given name
Omari Abdallah (born 1943), Tanzanian runner
Omari Akhmedov (born 1987), Russian mixed martial artist
Omari Aldridge (born 1984), Saint Vincentian footballer
Omari Allen (born 1990), Montserratian cricketer
Omari Banks (born 1982), Anguillan musician and cricketer
Omari Caro (born 1991), English rugby league footballer
Omari Cobb (born 1997), American football player
Omari Glasgow (born 2003), Guyanese footballer
Omari Golaya (born 1954), Tanzanian boxer
Omari Gudul (born 1994), Congolese basketball player
Omari Hardwick (born 1974), American actor
Omari Hardy (born 1989), American politician
Omari Johnson (born 1990), Jamaican-American basketball player
Omari Kimweri (born 1982), Tanzanian-American boxer
Omari Newton, Canadian actor
Omari Nundu (1948–2019), Tanzanian politician
Omari Nyenje (born 1993), Tanzanian footballer
Omari Patrick (born 1996), English footballer
Omari Spellman (born 1997), American basketball player
Omari Sterling-James (born 1993), West Indian footballer
Omari Swinton (born 1980), American economist
Omari Tetradze (born 1969), Russian footballer

Surname
Abdelaziz El Omari (born 1968), Moroccan politician
Abdulaziz al-Omari (1979–2001), Saudi terrorist
Abdul Rahman al-Omari (born 1972), Saudi pilot
Adnan bin Abdullah bin Faris al Omari, Saudi terrorist
Ali Omari (born 1983), Afghan footballer
Ali El-Omari (born 1978), Moroccan footballer
Amer Al-Omari (born 1983), Qatari footballer
Areen Omari, Palestinian actress
Bahri Omari (1888–1945), Albanian politician
Constant Omari (born 1958), Congolese football administrator
Fatos Omari, Albanian chess master
Levy Matebo Omari (born 1989), Kenyan long-distance runner
Mansour al-Omari (born 1979), Syrian journalist
Mohammad Nabi Omari (born 1968), Afghan terrorist
Morocco Omari (born 1975), American film director
Najibullah Khwaja Omari (born 1955), Afghan politician
Omar Omari, Pakistani politician
Osama Omari (born 1992), Syrian footballer
Qemal Omari, Turkish football manager
Walid Al-Omari (born 1957), Palestinian journalist